Bruno Barbosa da Encarnação or simply Bruno Barbosa (born May 13, 1985 in Nova Iguaçu), is a Brazilian striker. He currently plays for KF Partizani Tirana in the Albanian Superliga.

Honours
Rio de Janeiro State League: 2004
Ceará State League: 2007

Career
Barbosa started off his career in Brazil with Clube de Regatas do Flamengo. However things didn't go too well for Barbosa at the club as he struggled to break into a very strong side. He was loaned out to Atlético-GO in 2006, then Goytacaz Futebol Clube in the same year. Barbosa was then loaned out to Fortaleza Esporte Clube for the rest of the 2006-2007 season. After he returned to Clube de Regatas do Flamengo in 2007 he was not given a chance and he had his contract terminated.

Albania
Barbosa had spent several months searching for teams in Brazil and the rest of the world. His search came to an end when he was discovered by KF Partizani Tirana in Albania. He was signed on free transfer because he was not currently with a team and was given a contract by the club along with fellow Brazilian Paulo Marcel Pereira Merabet, a player who had also been without a club for almost a year.

External links
 CBF
 fortaleza.net

1985 births
Living people
Brazilian footballers
CR Flamengo footballers
Atlético Clube Goianiense players
Goytacaz Futebol Clube players
Fortaleza Esporte Clube players
FK Partizani Tirana players
Expatriate footballers in Albania
People from Nova Iguaçu
Association football forwards
Sportspeople from Rio de Janeiro (state)